Harmony is the second studio album by Never Shout Never and was released August 24, 2010. The packaging of the CD comes with flower seeds (while the limited edition bundle also includes a flower pot with the album name on it) with planting instructions "so you can get involved and make the world a more beautiful place!" The album was streamed on his MySpace on August 22, 2010. Harmony debuted at number 14 on the Billboard 200 albums chart and sold 23,000 copies first week.

Critical reception

Harmony has so far received mixed to negative reviews. Gregory Heaney from Allmusic, although applauding the production of the album, criticized the album's lyrics, saying that "while the production has grown up, Drew still seems to be in the same place as a songwriter. [...] Though Drew has proven that he has a good ear for melody, his over-sweetened lyrics rob the songs of any real emotional weight." Scott Heisel from Alternative Press, however, was more positive, stating that "the most hated man in emo [...] sounds even stronger than he did on [What is Love?, his debut album], turning in consistently better vocal performances that demonstrate a slight hint of [...] maturity while handling lyrical topics both serious [...] and not-so-much."

In an interview with Propertyofzack.com, when asked if he was happy with the album's reception, Drew responded, "Sort of. It was a fun record to make, but we only had two weeks to make it. It was a very fun record. Butch was a great guy to work with. Harmony was okay; it’s not my favorite album ever. I don’t listen to it. I would never listen to it."

Melody
Melody is a digital release described by record label Sire as a "Deluxe Digital Collection". It contains the song from Harmony, "cheatercheaterbestfriendeater" as well as an exclusive jam called "Coffee and Cigarettes" along with the "Coffee and Cigarettes" video. It was released on July 27, 2010.

Track listing

Personnel
Credits for Harmony adapted from AllMusic.

Never Shout Never
Christofer Drew Ingle – lead vocals, guitars, bass, ukulele, violin, drums, percussion, tambourine, cabasa, djembe, glockenspiel, xylophone, marimba, sleigh bells, piano, keyboards, synthesizers, programming, banjo, harmonica, composer, lyrics
Caleb Denison – additional guitars

Production
Produced by Butch Vig
Engineered by Billy Bush
Mastered by Dan Hersch
Mixed by Jon Kaplan
Designs and illustrations by Frank Maddocks
Additional engineering by Chris Steffen
Photography by Colby Moore and Christofer Drew Ingle
Production coordination by Shari Sutcliffe
A&R by Craig Aaronson and Perry Watts-Russell

Charts

References

2010 albums
Never Shout Never albums
Sire Records albums
Warner Records albums
Albums produced by Butch Vig